Volkswagen Bora is a name used by the German company Volkswagen on several different models of cars:

 Volkswagen Bora, the Jetta MK4 was rebadged as the Volkswagen Bora outside of North America.
  Volkswagen Bora, the Jetta MK5 was rebadged as the Volkswagen Bora in Mexico and Colombia.
 Volkswagen Bora (China), an independent model line originated from the Jetta MK4-based Bora produced by FAW-VW in China.

Bora